"Disco' La Passione" is a 1996 song by British singer-songwriter Chris Rea. The song was written for the film La Passione, a semi-autobiography by Rea. Shirley Bassey made her feature film debut here, but the film was a disappointment at the box office. A single was issued, produced by Rea and, unusual for Bassey, credited as co-performer.  The track also appears on the soundtrack album La Passione. The single sold well in Europe, making the Top 40 of the Dutch and Belgian charts, but just missed being a Top 40 hit on the UK Singles Chart, charting at number 41.

A video was issued to promote the single, it is taken from the performance made in the film. Shirley Bassey performed the song frequently live in 1996 and 1997, a live recording of the song appears on the 1997 CD The Birthday Concert.

Track listing 
European 2 track CD single 
 Disco' La Passione" (Film Version) -4.54
 Disco' La Passione" (Adams and Gielen 12 Inch Mix) -5.22

UK 3 track maxi CD single and 12" vinyl single
 Disco' La Passione" (Film Version) -4.54
 Disco' La Passione" (Adams and Gielen 12 Inch Mix) -5.22
 Disco' La Passione" (Adams and Gielen 7 Inch Mix) -3.21
 "Horses" (Instrumental) -3.05

Personnel 
 Shirley Bassey - Vocal 
 Gavin Wright Film Orchestra
 Max Middleton - Conductor
 Chris Rea - Bass, Drums, Guitars and Keyboards

References

External links 

Songs about disco
1996 singles
1996 songs
Shirley Bassey songs
Chris Rea songs
Songs written by Chris Rea
East West Records singles